The Roman Catholic Diocese of Cruz Alta is a diocese located in the city of Cruz Alta in the Ecclesiastical province of Santa Maria in Brazil.

History
 27 May 1971: Established as Diocese of Cruz Alta from the Diocese of Santa Maria

Bishops
 Bishops of Cruz Alta 
 Walmor Battú Wichrowski (1971.05.27 – 1972.11.16)
 Nei Paulo Moretto (1972.11.16 – 1976.01.21), appointed Coadjutor Bishop of Caxias do Sul, Rio Grande do Sul 
 Jacó Roberto Hilgert (1976.07.19 – 2002.05.08)
 Frederico Heimler S.D.B. (2002.05.08 – 2014.06.11)
 Adelar Baruffi (2014.12.17 - present) 

Coadjutor bishop
Pedro Ercílio Simon (1990-1995), did not succeed to see; appointed Bishop of Uruguaiana, Rio Grande do Sul

References
 GCatholic.org
 Catholic Hierarchy

Roman Catholic dioceses in Brazil
Christian organizations established in 1971
Cruz Alta, Roman Catholic Diocese of
Roman Catholic dioceses and prelatures established in the 20th century
1971 establishments in Brazil